Kauni is a village in the Sri Muktsar Sahib district of Punjab, India. Its located 18km to east of Muktsar and 28km to North of Gidderbaha town. 

Kauni comes under the Gidderbaha Legislative Assembly (MLA). Its Lok Sabha (Member of Parliament) constituency is Faridkot.

References

Villages in Sri Muktsar Sahib district